Hexalobus is a genus of flowering plants in the family Annonaceae. There are five species native to tropical Africa.

They grow in several types of tropical habitat.

Most species have fragrant flowers. The petals are fused at the bases, making the flowers somewhat tubular. The petals are wrinkly in texture and cream to yellow in color, sometimes with darker rims.

Species:
Hexalobus bussei
Hexalobus crispiflorus
Hexalobus monopetalus
 Hexalobus mossambicensis
 Hexalobus salicifolius

References

Annonaceae
Annonaceae genera
Taxonomy articles created by Polbot